Julian Howard Shackleton (born 29 January 1952) is a former English cricketer. Shackleton was a right-handed batsman who bowled right-arm medium pace.

Gloucestershire
Shackleton made his first-class debut for Gloucestershire against Surrey in the 1971 County Championship. Shackleton played 48 first-class matches for the county, with his final first-class match coming against Lancashire in 1978. In his 48 first-class matches he scored 596 runs at a batting average of 13.54, with a high score of 46*. With the ball he took 49 wickets at a bowling average of 45.75, with best figures of 4/38. In the field he took 36 catches for Gloucestershire in first-class matches.

In the same year that he made his first-class debut for Gloucestershire, he made his List-A debut for the county against Hampshire. Shackleton made 75 List-A appearances for Gloucestershire from 1971 to 1978, with his final List-A match for the county coming against Leicestershire in 1978. Shackleton took 66 wickets for the county at an average of 33.59, with best figures of 5/20 against Surrey in 1977.

Move to Dorset
Eleven years after leaving Gloucestershire, Shackleton joined Dorset, making his debut for the county in the 1989 Minor Counties Championship against Cheshire. Shackleton played 61 Minor Counties matches for Dorset, with his final match for the county coming against Staffordshire in the final of the 1998 Minor Counties Championship, which ended in a draw.

In 1990 Shackleton made his List-A debut for Dorset against Glamorgan in the 1st round of the 1990 NatWest Trophy. Shackleton played 6 List-A matches for Dorset, with his final List-A match for the county coming against Hampshire in 1998 NatWest trophy. Shackleton had a disappointing time with the ball in his List-A career for Dorset, taking only 1 wickets at an average of 163.00.

Family
Shackleton's father Derek Shackleton played Test cricket for England. Shackleton was also a Hampshire legend, playing 585 first-class matches for the county and taking 2,669 wickets for the county, which to this day remains a Hampshire record. Toward the end of his career, his father also played for Dorset.

External links
Julian Shackleton at Cricinfo
Julian Shackleton at CricketArchive
Matches and detailed statistics for Julian Shackleton

1952 births
Living people
People from Todmorden
English cricketers
Gloucestershire cricketers
Dorset cricketers
Sportspeople from Yorkshire